Langkawi City Football Club is a Malaysian professional football club based in Langkawi, Kedah. They currently play in the third division of the Malaysian football, the Malaysia M4 League. The club home ground has been the 10,000-seating Langkawi Stadium.

History
Glory United was a club founded in 2017 in Shah Alam, Selangor and participated in several competitions in the Klang Valley.

In 2018, the club has won the Subang M5 League and become eligible to compete in the Malaysia M3 League.

Langkawi Glory United era
In 2019, the owner of Glory United was planning to set up a Langkawi-based club. An agreement was reached that Glory United FC officially moves to Langkawi, and gets renamed as Langkawi Glory United FC.

Langkawi Glory United FC failed to show impressive performance in the first season of the Malaysia M3 League when they finished 12th out of 14 teams competing.

Langkawi City FC era
After the 2019 season, Glory United owner agrees to sell the team, which was renamed again as Langkawi City F.C.

Players (2020)

Season by season record

Notes:  2020 Season cancelled due to the COVID-19 pandemic, no promotion or league title was awarded.

Kit manufacturer and shirt sponsor

Club officials
Senior official

Team officials

Head coaches

Honours
Domestic competitions
LeagueSubang Football League  Winners (1)': 2018

References

Malaysia M3 League
Football clubs in Malaysia